Cyrtogrammomma is a monotypic genus of South American brushed trapdoor spiders containing the single species, Cyrtogrammomma monticola. It was first described by Reginald Innes Pocock in 1895, and has only been found in Guyana.

References

Barychelidae
Monotypic Mygalomorphae genera
Spiders of South America
Taxa named by R. I. Pocock